Veslfjellet is a mountain in Vågå Municipality in Innlandet county, Norway. The mountain is surrounded by several other notable mountains including Kollhøin and Besshø to the northwest, Besseggen and Gloptinden to the west, Bukkehåmåren to the southwest, and Heimdalshøe to the southeast. The lake Bessvatnet lies just north of the mountain.

See also
List of mountains of Norway by height

References

Jotunheimen
Vågå
Mountains of Innlandet